(Evan Daniel) Aldred  Williams (20 August 1879 – 25 January 1951) was the Archdeacon of Cardigan from 1944 until his death.

Williams was educated at Llandovery College, St David's College, Lampeter and St Michael's College, Llandaff; and ordained in 1903. After curacies in Swansea and Carmarthen he held incumbencies at Golden Grove, Llansamlet, Dafen  and Llanddewi

He died on 5 March 1951.

References

1879 births
1951 deaths
People educated at Llandovery College
Alumni of the University of Wales, Lampeter
Alumni of St Michael's College, Llandaff
Archdeacons of Cardigan